Route 38 is a state highway in the southern part of the U.S. state of New Jersey serving the Philadelphia metropolitan area. It extends  from the Airport Circle, where it intersects U.S. Route 30 (US 30) and US 130, in Pennsauken Township, Camden County, east to an intersection with US 206 and CR 530 in Southampton Township, Burlington County. The entire route is closely parallel to CR 537 located to the north, being only one block away at places. The route is a multilane divided highway for most of its length and passes through commercial development, residential development, and some farmland.

Route 38 was signed in 1927, replacing part of Pre-1927 Route 18, which had run from Camden east to Toms River. Route 38 was originally planned to be a freeway crossing the state of New Jersey, running from Camden east to Wall Township, Monmouth County. The eastern part of this freeway would become part of Interstate 195 (I-195) in the late 1960s. The freeway routing was then modified to head north of Interstate 195 to the Route 18 freeway in Colts Neck Township but was ultimately canceled by the late 1970s due to environmental and financial concerns. Route 138 was originally numbered as a segment of this Route 38 freeway, but was renumbered by the 1990s when it became apparent the freeway would not be completed.

Route description

Route 38 begins at the Airport Circle junction of US 30, US 130, and CR 607 (Kaighns Avenue) in Pennsauken Township, Camden County, heading east on Kaighns Avenue. It comes to a partial cloverleaf interchange with the western terminus of Route 70, which replaced the Browning Road Traffic Circle. A six–lane divided highway separated by a Jersey barrier, it proceeds eastward, crossing into Cherry Hill Township, where it heads through commercial development. Route 38 features cloverleaf interchanges with CR 636 (Cuthbert Boulevard) and CR 644 (Haddonfield Road), passing under NJ Transit's Atlantic City Line between the two interchanges. Past the CR 644 interchange, Route 38 heads past the Cherry Hill Mall, located on the north side of the road. It proceeds through the Church Road Circle, where it crosses CR 616 (Church Road) and CR 627 (Coles Avenue/Cooper Landing Road).

Route 38 crosses the South Branch of the Pennsauken Creek into Maple Shade Township, Burlington County. The route then reaches a cloverleaf interchange with Route 41 and then has an interchange with Route 73. The Route 38-41-73 interchange complex replaced a dangerous and congested 6-way traffic circle. The route then crosses CR 608 (Lenola Road) into Moorestown Township, where it becomes unnamed. Route 38 then travels by the Moorestown Mall located to the south before passing by the Strawbridge Lake Park located to the north, where it crosses CR 607 (Church Street) and then CR 603 (Mount Laurel Road). It then enters Mount Laurel Township, where it intersects CR 615 (Marter Avenue) before meeting I-295 at a partial cloverleaf interchange and passing over the New Jersey Turnpike without access.

It then continues east, heading into more residential than commercial development and passing south of Rowan College at Burlington County. Route 38 intersects many roads with jughandles, including CR 686 (Hartford Road), CR 635 (Ark Road), and CR 636 (Masonville-Fostertown Road) crossing into Hainesport Township, where it further intersects CR 674 (Hainesport-Mount Laurel Road), CR 636 (Creek Road) without a traffic light, and CR 641 (Hainesport-Lumberton Road).  The route then crosses the South Branch of Rancocas Creek before entering Lumberton Township, where the road intersects CR 541 (Mount Holly Bypass).  Route 38 then runs through the southern part of the Mount Holly area, intersecting CR 691 (Madison Avenue/Main Street), the former alignment of CR 541. It crosses into Mount Holly Township at the intersection of CR 612 (Pine Street/Eayerstown Road).  Past this intersection, Route 38 eventually becomes an undivided highway and then reenters Lumberton Township. The route then heads into farmland and crosses into Southampton Township at the intersection with CR 684 (Smithville Road).  Route 38 then ends at the intersection with US 206 where the road continues east as CR 530 (Pemberton Road).

History

Prior to 1927, the route was a part of Pre-1927 Route 18, which was legislated in 1923 to run from Camden to Toms River.  In the 1927 New Jersey state highway renumbering, Route 38 was legislated to run along the route from Route 25 (now US 130) in Pennsauken Township east to Route 39 (now US 206) in Eastampton.

In 1938, Route 38 was legislated to extend from East Hampton to Route 4N (now Route 71) in Wall Township, Monmouth County. A section of this was built, running between Route 34 and Route 35 in Wall Township. The Route 38 freeway was then planned in 1961 to connect these two sections of Route 38. It was to run from I-80S (now I-676) in Camden east to the planned Route 35 freeway (now Route 18) in Wall Township, providing a direct freeway connection between the Philadelphia area and the northern Jersey Shore. The route of the freeway was to run east from the Ben Franklin Bridge, paralleling US 30 and then Route 70. It would then have run parallel to the current alignment of Route 38 through the Mount Holly area and then travel along the northern border of the Fort Dix Military Reservation to Jackson Township, Ocean County, where it would then follow the present alignment of I-195 to Wall Township. In the late 1960s, the eastern part of the Route 38 freeway became part of the proposed I-195.

In 1969, it was estimated the Route 38 freeway between I-295 in Cherry Hill Township and I-195 in Jackson Township would cost $60 million and be completed by 1985. The route of the freeway was revised in 1972 to head north of I-195 to the Route 18 freeway in Colts Neck Township, intersecting the Route 33 bypass of Freehold Borough. The western terminus was also moved to Mount Laurel Township, where it was to connect to the New Jersey Turnpike and the Route 90 freeway, which was projected to extend to the New Jersey Turnpike. It was estimated that this routing of the Route 38 freeway would cost $101 million. However, due to environmental concerns of the route passing through the Pine Barrens and financial troubles, the freeway was canceled by the end of the 1970s. The orphaned eastern section of Route 38 in Monmouth County was renumbered to Route 138 on July 29, 1988.

Major intersections

See also

References

External links

New Jersey Roads – History
New Jersey Roads – Photos
Speed Limits for Route 38

038
Transportation in Burlington County, New Jersey
Transportation in Camden County, New Jersey